Psen is a genus of aphid wasps in the family Crabronidae. There are at least 90 described species in Psen.

Species
 Psen affinis Gussakovskij, 1937
 Psen alishanus Tsuneki, 1967
 Psen amboinensis van Lith, 1965
 Psen angulifrons van Lith, 1965
 Psen anodontotus van Lith, 1976
 Psen aspites van Lith, 1968
 Psen assamensis van Lith, 1965
 Psen ater (Olivier, 1792)
 Psen aureohirtus Rohwer, 1921
 Psen aurifrons Tsuneki, 1959
 Psen bakeri Rohwer, 1923
 Psen barthi Viereck, 1907
 Psen betremi van Lith, 1959
 Psen bettoh Tsuneki, 1977
 Psen bishopi van Lith, 1968
 Psen bnun Tsuneki, 1971
 Psen boninensis Nagase, 2000
 Psen brinchangensis van Lith, 1965
 Psen bryani Perkins and Cheesman, 1928
 Psen carbonarius (F. Smith, 1865)
 Psen cheesmanae Krombein, 1949
 Psen congolus Leclercq, 1961
 Psen coriaceus van Lith, 1959
 Psen curvipilosus van Lith, 1959
 Psen dzimm Tsuneki, 1959
 Psen elisabethae van Lith, 1959
 Psen emarginatus van Lith, 1959
 Psen erythrocnemus van Lith, 1975
 Psen erythropoda Rohwer, 1910
 Psen eurypygus van Lith, 1965
 Psen foveicornis Tsuneki, 1982
 Psen foveolatus Budrys, 1986
 Psen fuscinervis (Cameron, 1899)
 Psen hanedanus Terayama and Murota, 2016
 Psen heinrichi van Lith, 1968
 Psen hirashimai Tsuneki, 1966
 Psen inflatus van Lith, 1968
 Psen irwini (Bohart and Grissell, 1969)
 Psen kalilicus Tsuneki, 1982
 Psen koreanus Tsuneki, 1959
 Psen krombeini van Lith, 1965
 Psen kulingensis van Lith, 1965
 Psen lacuniventris L. Ma and Q. Li, 2007
 Psen leclercqi van Lith, 1974
 Psen lieftincki van Lith, 1959
 Psen lobicornis van Lith, 1973
 Psen marjoriae van Lith, 1968
 Psen matalensis R. Turner, 1912
 Psen melanosoma Rohwer, 1921
 Psen metallicus van Lith, 1975
 Psen miyagino Tsuneki, 1983
 Psen monticola (Packard, 1867)
 Psen montivagus (Dalla Torre, 1897)
 Psen nepalensis van Lith, 1968
 Psen nigriventris van Lith, 1965
 Psen nitidus van Lith, 1959
 Psen novahibernicus van Lith, 1965
 Psen opacus van Lith, 1959
 Psen orientalis Cameron, 1890
 Psen paranaensis van Lith, 1975
 Psen patellatus Arnold, 1924
 Psen paulus van Lith, 1968
 Psen pilosus van Lith, 1965
 Psen politiventris Rohwer, 1921
 Psen pulcher (Cameron, 1891)
 Psen refractus Nurse, 1903
 Psen regalis van Lith, 1968
 Psen richardsi Tsuneki, 1959
 Psen rubicundus van Lith, 1959
 Psen ruficrus van Lith, 1965
 Psen rufiventris Cameron, 1890
 Psen rufoannulatus Cameron, 1907
 Psen sauteri van Lith, 1968
 Psen sedlaceki van Lith, 1968
 Psen seminitidus van Lith, 1965
 Psen seriatispinosus L. Ma and Q. Li, 2006
 Psen shirozui Tsuneki, 1966
 Psen shukuzanus Tsuneki, 1972
 Psen silvaticus Arnold, 1924
 Psen simlensis van Lith, 1968
 Psen spinitibialis L. Ma and Q. Li, 2007
 Psen striolatus (Cameron, 1891)
 Psen tanoi Tsuneki, 1967
 Psen terayamai Tsuneki, 1982
 Psen terrigenus van Lith, 1959
 Psen toxopeusi van Lith, 1959
 Psen triangulatus van Lith, 1959
 Psen unifasciculatus Malloch, 1933
 Psen ussuriensis van Lith, 1959
 Psen vadosus van Lith, 1968
 Psen vechti van Lith, 1959
 Psen venetus Pate, 1946
 Psen yasumatsui Gussakovskij, 1934
 Psen yomasanus van Lith, 1965
 Psen yunnanensis L. Ma and Q. Li, 2007

References

Further reading

 Arnett, Ross H. (2000). American Insects: A Handbook of the Insects of America North of Mexico. CRC Press.

External links

 NCBI Taxonomy Browser, Psen

Crabronidae